William Brown (29 July 1885 – 25 September 1915) was a Scottish professional footballer who played as a outside-right in the Scottish Football League for Dundee Hibernian.

Personal life
Brown served as a private in the Black Watch during the First World War. He was killed on the Western Front on 25 September 1915 and is commemorated at the Loos Memorial.

Career statistics

References

1885 births
1915 deaths
20th-century Scottish people
Footballers from Dundee
Military personnel from Dundee
Scottish footballers
Association football forwards
Arbroath F.C. players
Dundee United F.C. players
British Army personnel of World War I
Black Watch soldiers
British military personnel killed in World War I